Philemon Thomas (February 9, 1763 – November 18, 1847) was a member of the United States House of Representatives representing the state of Louisiana. He served two terms as a Democrat (1831–1835).

Philemon was born in Orange County, Virginia. He served in the American forces during Revolutionary War and later moved to Kentucky. He was a member of Kentucky's Constitutional Convention and served in the state House and state Senate. In 1806 he moved to Louisiana. He commanded troops who on 1810 September 23 captured the Spanish fort in at Baton Rouge, commencing the West Florida Rebellion of 1810.  A few days later the West Florida Assembly, meeting at Saint Francisville, commissioned General Philemon Thomas to march the West Florida Army across the newly proclaimed Republic.

According to Southeastern Louisiana University history professor Sam Hyde,
Residents of the western Florida Parishes proved largely supportive of the revolt, . . .  while the majority of the population in the eastern region of the Florida Parishes opposed the insurrection. Thomas’ army violently suppressed opponents of the revolt, leaving a bitter legacy in the Tangipahoa and Tchefuncte River regions.

Philemon Thomas served in the War of 1812 and later served two terms in Congress. He ran for Governor twice, in 1824 and in 1828. He died in Baton Rouge, Louisiana, and is interred there in the Baton Rouge National Cemetery.

Notes

External links
Political Graveyard

1763 births
1847 deaths
Louisiana Democrats
Jacksonian members of the United States House of Representatives from Louisiana
19th-century American politicians